Robert U. Griffin is an American jazz trombonist and an assistant professor of music at Florida A&M University. As a musician, Griffin performed with jazz, rock and funk bands at shows and festivals across the United States and at French and Italian jazz festivals. At FAMU, professor Griffin has served as the director of the Marching "100" Trombones as well as the school's Trombone Choir, Jazz Ensemble II and Jazz Combo.

Background
Griffin studied at Florida A&M University, where he earned his Bachelor of Science degree in music education. Later, Griffin earned a Master of Science degree in music education and Master of Arts in jazz performance from the University of South Florida under his mentor and professor Tom Brantley.

Griffin has been both a band leader and the arranger for the USF Jazz Bone Band and USF's Jazz Ensemble II. Griffin has served as a sideman for numerous artists, including Ben Jaffe.

References

Year of birth missing (living people)
Living people
American jazz trombonists
Male trombonists
Florida A&M University faculty
Florida A&M University alumni
University of South Florida alumni
21st-century trombonists
21st-century American male musicians
American male jazz musicians